Ana María Choquehuanca de Villanueva (born 2 November 1958, in Arequipa) is a Peruvian politician, businesswoman, and economist. In 2016, she was elected to Congress to represent Arequipa. She was the Minister of Women and Vulnerable Populations from 27 July 2017 to 2 April 2018.

Biography
Choquehuanca began her studies at the colleges of Nuestra Señora de la Asunción and Nuestra Señora de la Merced in the city of her birth, Arequipa. Later, she began studying economics at the Catholic University of Santa María and completed a master's degree in Administration at Spenta University in Mexico. Choquehuanca possesses a postgraduate degree from the Catholic University of Santa María and the University of Zaragoza.

In the private sector, Choquehuanca has been a manager for Uranio Contratistas EIRL, METALSUR, and ISVISA. She is president of the Association of Small Businesses of Pyme-Peru and of the Pyme Chamber of Arequipa.

In 2016, Choquehuanca was elected to the Congress of the Republic of Peru representing Peruvians for Change for the city of Arequipa for the 2016–2021 term.

On 27 July 2017, she was made Minister of Women and Vulnerable Populations until 2 April 2018 when she was replaced with Ana María Mendieta by Martín Vizcarra.

Citations

External links
Peruvian Congress

Living people
1958 births
People from Arequipa
20th-century Peruvian economists
Peruvian women in business
Women government ministers of Peru
21st-century Peruvian women politicians
21st-century Peruvian politicians
Peruvian women economists
21st-century Peruvian economists
20th-century businesswomen
21st-century businesswomen
Women's ministers of Peru
Catholic University of Santa María alumni